Banisia tibiale is a species of moth of the family Thyrididae. It is found in the Seychelles on Marianne Island and Silhouette Island.

This moths remembers Banisia myrtaea (Drury, 1773) from which it can be distinguished by the swollen hind tibiae of the male.

References

Thyrididae
Moths described in 1912
Fauna of Seychelles